The molecular formula C20H19NO5 (molar mass: 353.37 g/mol, exact mass: 353.1263 u) may refer to:

 Chelidonine
 Lennoxamine
 LY-341,495
 LY-344,545
 Protopine

Molecular formulas